In Greek mythology, Celtine (Keltine) was the daughter of Bretannus and mother of Celtus. She is known for having been one of the consorts of Heracles.

Mythology 
Her story, recorded by Parthenius of Nicaea, is as follows.

When Heracles was driving the cattle of Geryon to Greece, he stopped at Bretannus' house. Celtine fell in love with her father's guest and tricked him into consorting with her: she hid away the kine and told Heracles that in order to get the herd back, he had to make love to her. Heracles, both anxious to bring the cattle safe to Eurystheus and overcome by Celtine's beauty, consented. From their union was born a son Celtus, eponym of the Celts.

A version of this myth is also found in the Etymologicum Magnum. It refers to the heroine as Celto (Κελτώ, Kelto), and tells that Heracles left her his bow, telling her that their future child – if it were a boy – would become king if strong enough to string the bow. In due time, a son Celtus was born. The same source also mentions an alternate tradition according to which Celtus was the son of Heracles by the Pleiad Sterope.

Notes

References 
 Parthenius, Love Romances translated by Sir Stephen Gaselee (1882-1943), S. Loeb Classical Library Volume 69. Cambridge, MA. Harvard University Press. 1916.  Online version at the Topos Text Project.
 Parthenius, Erotici Scriptores Graeci, Vol. 1. Rudolf Hercher. in aedibus B. G. Teubneri. Leipzig. 1858. Greek text available at the Perseus Digital Library.

Women of Heracles
Women in Greek mythology